Stéphane Lefebvre (born 16 March 1992) is a rally driver from France.

He won the World Rally Championship-3 and Junior World Rally Championship in the  season, and scored his first points at the 2015 Rallye Deutschland, his first time driving a World Rally Car.

Results

WRC results
 
* Season still in progress.

WRC-2 results

WRC-3 results

JWRC results

References

External links

1992 births
World Rally Championship drivers
French rally drivers
Living people
Citroën Racing drivers
Peugeot Sport drivers
Saintéloc Racing drivers